The Chevrolet SS was a concept car designed, branded, and built by Chevrolet. It was introduced at the 2003 North American International Auto Show, but was never approved for official production. The SS (which stands for Super Sport) was intended to be a modern version of past SS variant vehicles, such as the Camaro and Chevelle.

Engine
The suspension of the SS was tuned for performance rather than comfort and emphasized its sporting characteristics. The integrated exhaust pipes on the bumpers of the SS were similar to those of historical muscle cars. An 8.0 L  engine was originally installed in the car, but it was removed.

Design
The design of the SS is a fastback sedan and it is a mix of styles and styling cues from both modern sports and muscle cars. It featured vinyl and leather seats, and it also had functions from earlier Chevrolet muscle cars such as the horseshoe-shaped shifter. There were modern electronics and functions such as a DVD player and an audio system complete with satellite radio.

External links
Chevy SS at Edmunds.com

SS
Rear-wheel-drive vehicles
Cars introduced in 2003
Sports sedans